Kiss Does... Rave is a compilation album released by the Kiss Network on 30 April 2007. It was released on both a two-CD album and on a 1GB USB flash drive – it was the first album in the UK to be released in USB format, and was sold exclusively through HMV stores and on Kiss and HMV's websites. Steve Parkinson, Kiss's managing director, described releasing the album on USB as "another example of Kiss being ahead of the game, knowing its audience and engaging with them in ways that will inspire and entertain".

The first disc of the CD version of the album comprised 19 rave tracks from the 1990s; the second disc contained 18 new rave songs from the 2000s. The USB version held 26 tracks in 256kpbs WMA format. NME described Kiss Does... Rave as being "the first album to draw the line between original and nu rave".

Track listings

References

External links

2007 compilation albums
Kiss Network